In the biblical books Exodus, Leviticus and Numbers, Nadab and Abihu were the two oldest sons of Aaron.

Moses instructed Aaron and his family not to mourn, although the people at large were permitted.

Background
Nadab and Abihu were the first two sons of  Aaron the Levite by his marriage to Elisheba, daughter of Amminadab from the tribe of Judah. They had four sons in total, the younger two sons being named Eleazar and Ithamar. During the Exodus journey, after the Israelites' affirmation of their covenant with God, Abihu and Nadab accompanied Moses, Aaron, and 70 elders up Mount Sinai. There they saw God with great clarity, walking on a pavement of sapphire stone, and shared a meal in God's presence, without being harmed as a result.

Aaron and his four sons were the first priests appointed as the priestly system was established by God. The Levites as a tribe were later ordained for the priestly service after answering a call to take the 's side after the idolatry centered on the golden calf.  After the death of Nadab and Abihu, Eleazar and Ithamar took their places as priests, because neither Nadab nor Abihu had any sons.

Violation of God’s law and punishment
In Exodus 30 and Leviticus, God outlines a proper sacrifice to him. Aaron, the chief priest, was to present all offerings representing himself and the people.  God would send his own fire to consume the sacrifice as a sign of his presence.

When Nadab and Abihu lit the offering in the censers themselves, their fire was profane and thus God was not in it. They prepared an incense offering upon kindling of their own and not of the holy incense from the sacred bronze altar. This was seen as foreign or unholy fire ( ’êš zārāh). Aaron’s sons spurned the command to wait for holy fire and offered incense with profane fire. Anyone who altered the sacrificial system assumed a prerogative belonging to God alone.

Burial and mourning

Burial
After the death of Nadab and Abihu, Moses dictated what was to be done with their bodies. He told Mishael and Elzaphan, the sons of Uzziel, Aaron's, his own and their sister Miriam's uncle, to carry the bodies away from the sanctuary to a place outside of the camp. He specified for Mishael and Elzaphan to be careful to only touch Nadab and Abihu's tunics, and not their bodies. The first concerns in burial were to prevent what is holy from being defiled and the service of God from being disrupted. The corpses had to be removed immediately, because to allow the uncleanliness of the bodies to remain in the sanctuary could invoke God's wrath again. The bodies were lifted up "by their tunics" to avoid direct physical contact. This did not prevent the carriers from becoming ritually unclean, but lessened the time and procedures needed to restore them to ritual purity.

Mourning
Aaron and the other surviving priests were commanded not to mourn, participate in mourning rituals, or have contact with the dead. This was applicable not only in this case; but it was modified in an ongoing command. While priests could mourn, they could not have contact with the dead - even a dead spouse, parent or child - and they could not participate in public mourning rituals. As the representatives of the people, priests were to avoid anything that might disqualify them for God's service. They were to remain ready and able to act in God's service whenever the community needed them.

The command not to mourn also applied because the crime of Nadab and Abihu was so provoking to God and fully merited the punishment which God had inflicted. To mourn in this case could be seen by the people as accusing God of undue severity. Both the people and the priests needed to show submission to a righteous judgement. If the anointed priests were to sin in this manner, the blame would fall not only upon them but also upon the people. In addition, all Jews are prohibited from mourning on the Sabbath and during festivals of the Lord. These are days for celebration, no sorrow is permitted to impinge upon the joy of the days.

However, the people in the community as a whole were allowed to mourn and display grief. The death of Nadab and Abihu was tragic yet deserved, and the people were to first recognize that it was deserved and then mourn their death.

In Judaism
Nadab and Abihu's sin was an encroachment on duties which devolved on their father alone as the high priest. But the offense was of a far more aggravated nature than an encroachment on duties. There were multiple sins contained in one act. First, they ventured unauthorized to perform the incense service—the highest and most solemn of the priestly duties. They also engaged together in a work which was the duty only of one. And, thirdly, they presumed to light the fire on the offering themselves. In this respect, "they offered foreign fire before the Lord"; they were guilty of a presumptuous and unwarranted intrusion into a sacred office which did not belong to them. In these actions they showed carelessness, irreverence, and a want of faith, lamentable especially for those in the priestly service. A precedent of such evil tendency was dangerous, and it was imperatively necessary, therefore, as well for the priests themselves as well as for the sacred things, that God should give a punishment.

In Christianity

Roman Catholicism
Whether Nadab and Abihu neglected to follow God's outlined sacrificial system out of presumptuousness, or out of thoughtlessness and inattention, their fault was severely punished so that all might learn to comply exactly with God's commands, and not try to change them or explain them away. The mixing of falsehood with the word of God was a serious sin. Those in power, like priests, should be especially careful in their behavior, because they are examples to those they serve.

Reformation and Post-Reformation views
Nadab and Abihu were in a great position to become honorable and respected priests. If Nadab and Abihu's deed had been done through ignorance, they would have been told to bring a sin-offering. But instead they did it presumptuously (deliberately and arrogantly), and in contempt of God's majesty and justice. They were therefore cut off, for the wages of sin is death. The sin and punishment of these priests showed the imperfection of that priesthood from the very beginning, and that it could not shelter any from the fire of God's wrath.

References

Book of Exodus people
Book of Numbers people
Family of Aaron
Book of Leviticus
Levites